{{DISPLAYTITLE:C17H24N2O2}}
The molecular formula C17H24N2O2 (molar mass : 288.39 g/mol) may refer to:

 4,5-MDO-DiPT
 5,6-MDO-DiPT
 Phenglutarimide

Molecular formulas